Mayhem Festival 2009 was the second annual North American Mayhem Festival founded by Kevin Lyman. In July 2009 a DLC song pack was sold in the music video game Rock Band 2.

Rockstar Mayhem Festival 2009 line up
Band lineup as released by the press release from the Mayhem Festival website and bands page of the Mayhem Festival website.

Main Stage
 Marilyn Manson
Slayer
Killswitch Engage
Bullet for My Valentine
Mushroomhead (replace Bullet for My Valentine on 7/31 - 8/02)

Jägermeister Stage
Trivium
All That Remains
God Forbid
Jägermeister Battle of the Bands winner (one per location):

Hot Topic Stage
Cannibal Corpse 
Behemoth
Job for a Cowboy 
The Black Dahlia Murder
Whitechapel

Tour dates

Mayhem Festival 2009 tour dates as seen on official website. Some dates that were originally seen on the press release have been removed with no explanation given.

References

Mayhem Festival by year
2009 concert tours
2009 music festivals
2009 festivals in the United States
July 2009 events in the United States
August 2009 events in the United States